This is a list of cricketers who have played first-class, List A or Twenty20 cricket for Chhattisgarh cricket team. Seasons given are first and last seasons; the player did not necessarily play in all the intervening seasons. Players in bold have played international cricket.

A
Ashish verma, 2018/19

C
Abhimanyu Chauhan, 2016/17

G
Sahil Gupta, 2016/17

K
Mohammad Kaif, 2016/17

M
Ajay Mandal, 2016/17

N
Vivek Naidu, 2016/17

R
Pankaj Rao, 2016/17
Sumit Ruikar, 2016/17

S
Ashutosh Singh, 2016/17
Prateek Sinha, 2016/17

T
Abhishek Tamrakar, 2016/17
Rishabh Tiwari, 2016/17

Chhattisgarh cricketers

cricketers